Potassium lactate is a compound with formula KC3H5O3, or H3C-CHOH-COOK. It is the potassium salt of lactic acid. It is produced by neutralizing lactic acid which is fermented from a sugar source.  It has E number "E326".  Potassium lactate is a liquid product that is usually 60% solids but is available at up to 78% solids.

Uses

Culinary uses
Potassium lactate is commonly used in meat and poultry products to extend shelf life and increase food safety as it has a broad antimicrobial action and is effective at inhibiting most spoilage and pathogenic bacteria.

Fire fighting uses
Potassium lactate is also used as an extinguishing medium in the First Alert Tundra fire extinguishers.

References

Lactates
Food additives
Potassium compounds
E-number additives